Brandon Nicolás Obregón (born 23 May 1996) is an Argentine professional footballer who plays as a midfielder for Quilmes.

Career
Obregón's senior career began with Quilmes, having joined from Independiente in 2016. He made his debut in the Primera División on 25 March 2017 at the Estadio Pedro Bidegain against San Lorenzo, which preceded a further eight appearances arriving in the 2016–17 season as Quilmes were relegated to Primera B Nacional. After playing a total of nine times in 2016–17, he featured in the same amount of fixtures in 2017–18 as they missed the promotion play-offs by three points.

Career statistics
.

References

External links

1996 births
Living people
Sportspeople from Buenos Aires Province
Argentine footballers
Association football midfielders
Argentine Primera División players
Primera Nacional players
Quilmes Atlético Club footballers
21st-century Argentine people